× Odontonia, abbreviated as Odtna. in the horticultural trade, was the archaic nothogenus for intergeneric orchid hybrids including the two orchid genera Miltonia and Odontoglossum (Milt. × Odm.) but when in fact the most × Odontonia hybrids were made with Miltoniopsis (Mltnps.).

References

Orchid nothogenera
Oncidiinae
Historically recognized angiosperm taxa